Associazione Calcio Fiorentina had a poor season, finishing 16th in Serie A and being relegated to Serie B as a result. The highlight of the season was a crushing 7–3 defeat suffered at home to eventual champions Milan. The season would also see four different managers at the helm.

Players

Goalkeepers
  Gianmatteo Mareggini
  Alessandro Mannini
  Emiliano Betti

Defenders
  Antonio Dell'Oglio
  Mario Faccenda
  Alberto Malusci
  Vittorio Tosto
  Stefano Pioli
  Vincenzo Matrone
  Stefano Carobbi
  Daniele Carnasciali
  Fabrizio Di Mauro

Midfielders
  Daniele Amerini
  Giuseppe Iachini
  Damiano Moscardi
  Massimo Orlando
  Stefano Salvatori
  Massimiliano Fiondella
  Stefan Effenberg
  Rufo Emiliano Verga

Forwards
  Gabriel Batistuta
  Stefano Borgonovo
  Giacomo Banchelli
  Marco Branca
  Fabio Graccaneli
  Daniele Gilardi
  Pietro Maiellaro
  Massimiliano Memmo
  Francesco Baiano
  Brian Laudrup

Competitions

Serie A

League table

Matches

Topscorers
16 Gabriel Batistuta
8 Francesco Baiano
5 Stefan Effenberg
5 Brian Laudrup

Coppa Italia

Second round

Round of 16

References

ACF Fiorentina seasons
Fiorentina